Mary Boyoi is a South Sudanese singer, Author and daughter to former SSPDF Commander.

Personal life 
Mary's father, a Murle tribal chief and military commander within the Sudan People's Liberation Movement/Army (SPLM/A) was killed in 1989. After her father's death, she and her family spent a number of years in displaced camps in Sudan and refugee camps in Ethiopia to avoid conflicts of the war.

She continued her higher education in Kenya and completed a series of diploma courses. In 2002, she began working for humanitarian relief agencies in various locations throughout South Sudan.

In 2005 she founded ABONA International, a nonprofit organization aimed at supporting peace throughout South Sudan and providing assistance to girls and young women in violent and destructive situations. In 2007 she began work on her first music project, “Referendum”.

Mary Boyoi is currently the executive director and founder of Voice of the Peace (VOP). VOP is a national NGO that provides psychosocial support and referral pathways for medical care to survivors of Gender-Based Violence (GBV). The NGO largely focus on community awareness by reaching out to various groups in the community. VOP has child-friendly spaces as well as girl-friendly spaces to provide a safe haven for survivors of GBV. They also work with vulnerable women and girls by providing them with skills such as basket weaving, embroidery and other crafts to empower them to become financially independent.

In January 2010, Boyoi was nominated by members of the Murle community to run for a parliamentary seat in the Southern Sudan Legislative Assembly in Juba.  She campaigned for the elections that took place in April, 2010.

Zooz, a song from Boyoi's yet to be released second album was featured on Sudan Votes Music Hopes in March 2010.  Sudan Votes Music Hopes is a collaboration of artists from across Sudan that wrote election songs "to encourage the people of Sudan to make a mark on their future". The SVMH album was compiled by German singer songwriter Max Herre and is being distributed across Sudan on audio cassettes, radio and digitally via sudanvotes.com. The production was realized by Media in Cooperation and Transition (MICT) and was financed by the German Foreign Office. In August 2012, the Süd Electronic label released a vinyl with house remixes by Tama Sumo and Portable.

Marriage 
Mary was married to an American humanitarian worker with whom she has 4 children with; all boys. She is believed to have separated with the man.

References

External links
 Mary Boyoi's Myspace page
 Mary Boyoi Fanpage on Facebook
 Music of Boyoi
 Boyoi on Youtube
 Mary Boyoi's song Zooz on Sudan Votes Music Hopes
 Boomkat review for Mary Boyoi - Zooz (Tama Sumo / Portable Mixes)

1980 births
Living people
South Sudanese singers
People from Upper Nile (state)
South Sudanese Protestants
South Sudanese women in politics
21st-century South Sudanese women politicians
21st-century South Sudanese politicians